A rice burger or riceburger is a variation on the traditional hamburger with compressed rice patties substituted for the hamburger buns. The MOS Burger fast-food restaurant chain introduced the rice burger in Japan 1987, and since then it has become a popular food item in East Asia.  Beginning around 2005 McDonald's also offered a rice burger in some of its Asian stores, with mixed results.
In South Korea they are known as "bapburgers" (bap/bab means rice in Korean language). Popular Korean-style rice burgers include fillings such as Stir-fried kimchi and tuna with mayonnaise.

See also
List of hamburgers

References

Further reading
Mos May Open 200 China Outlets on Rice Burger Demand – Taipei Times
Japanese rice burgers join our foodscape

External links

Singapore: McDonald's launches rice burger
McDonald's Chinese Take-out
Japanese-style Hamburgers at Mos Burger Tokyo,Japan
Sydney Opens its First Rice Burger Bar, Gojima

Japanese rice dishes
Vietnamese cuisine
Hamburgers (food)
Rice cakes